Dāna (Devanagari: दान, IAST: Dāna) is a Sanskrit and Pali word that connotes the virtue of generosity, charity or giving of alms in Indian religions and philosophies. 

In Hinduism, Buddhism, Jainism, and Sikhism, dāna is the practice of cultivating generosity. It can take the form of giving to an individual in distress or need. It can also take the form of philanthropic public projects that empower and help many.

Dāna is an ancient practice in Indian traditions, tracing back to Vedic traditions.

Hinduism

Dāna (Sanskrit: दान) means giving, often in the context of donation and charity. In other contexts, such as rituals, it can simply refer to the act of giving something. Dāna is related to and mentioned in ancient texts with concepts of Paropakāra (परोपकार) which means benevolent deed, helping others; Dakshina (दक्षिणा) which means gift or fee one can afford; and Bhiksha (भिक्षा), which means alms.

Dāna has been defined in traditional texts as any action of relinquishing the ownership of what one considered or identified as one's own, and investing the same in a recipient without expecting anything in return.

While dāna is typically given to one person or family, Hinduism also discusses charity or giving aimed at public benefit, sometimes called utsarga. This aims at larger projects such as building a rest house, school, drinking water or irrigation well, planting trees, and building care facility among others.

Dāna in Hindu texts
The Rigveda has the earliest discussion of dāna in the Vedas. The Rigveda relates it to satya "truth" and in another hymn points to the guilt one feels from not giving to those in need. It uses da, the root of word dāna, in its hymns to refer to the act of giving to those in distress. Ralph T. H. Griffith, for example, translates Book 10, Hymn 117 of the Rig veda as follows:

The Upanishads, composed before 500 BCE, present some of the earliest Upanishadic discussion of dāna. Brihadaranyaka Upanishad, in verse 5.2.3, states that three characteristics of a good, developed person are self-restraint (damah), compassion or love for all sentient life (daya), and charity (dāna).

Chandogya Upanishad, Book III, similarly, states that a virtuous life requires: tapas (asceticism), dāna (charity), arjava (straightforwardness), ahimsa (non-injury to all sentinent beings) and satyavacana (truthfulness).

Bhagavad Gita describes the right and wrong forms of dāna in verses 17.20 through 17.22. It defines sāttvikam (good, enlightened, pure) charity, in verse 17.20, as one given without expectation of return, at the proper time and place, and to a worthy person. It defines rajas (passion, ego driven, active) charity, in verse 17.21, as one given with the expectation of some return, or with a desire for fruits and results, or grudgingly. It defines tamas (ignorant, dark, destructive) charity, in verse 17.22, as one given with contempt, to unworthy person(s), at a wrong place and time. In Book 17, Bhadwad Gita suggests steadiness in sattvikam dāna, or the good form of charity is better; and that tamas should be avoided. These three psychological categories are referred to as the guṇas in Hindu philosophy.

The Adi Parva of the Hindu Epic Mahabharata, in Chapter 91, states that a person must first acquire wealth by honest means, then embark on charity; be hospitable to those who come to him; never inflict pain on any living being; and share a portion with others whatever he consumes. In Chapter 87 of Adi Parva, it calls sweet speech and refusal to use harsh words or wrong others even if you have been wronged, as a form of charity. In the Vana Parva, Chapter 194, the Mahabharata recommends that one must, "conquer the mean by charity, the untruthful by truth, the wicked by forgiveness, and dishonesty by honesty". Anushasana Parva in Chapter 58, recommends public projects as a form of dāna. It discusses the building of drinking water tanks for people and cattle as a noble form of giving, as well as giving of lamps for lighting dark public spaces. In later sections of Chapter 58, it describes planting public orchards, with trees that give fruits to strangers and shade to travelers, as meritorious acts of benevolent charity. In Chapter 59 of Book 13 of the Mahabharata, Yudhishthira and Bhishma discuss the best and lasting gifts between people:

The Bhagavata Purana discusses when dāna is proper and when it is improper. In Book 8, Chapter 19, verse 36 it states that charity is inappropriate if it endangers and cripples modest livelihood of one's biological dependents or of one’s own. Charity from surplus income above that required for modest living is recommended in the Puranas.

Hindu texts exist in many Indian languages. For example, the Tirukkuṛaḷ, written between 200 BCE and 400 CE, is one of the most cherished classics on Hinduism written in a South Indian language. It discusses charity, dedicating Chapter 23 of Book 1 on Virtues to it. Tirukkuṛaḷ suggests charity is necessary for an virtuous life and happiness. He states in Chapter 23: "Giving to the poor is true charity, all other giving expects some return"; "Great, indeed, is the power to endure hunger.
Greater still is the power to relieve other's hunger"; "Giving alms is a great reward in itself to one who gives". In Chapter 101, he states: "Believing wealth is everything, yet giving away nothing, is a miserable state of mind"; "Vast wealth can be a curse to one who neither enjoys it nor gives to the worthy". Like the Mahabharata, Tirukkuṛaḷ also extends the concept of charity to deeds (body), words (speech) and thoughts (mind). It states that a brightly beaming smile, the kindly light of loving eye, and saying pleasant words with sincere heart is a form of charity that every human being should strive to give.

Dāna in rituals
Dāna is also used to refer to rituals. For example, in a Hindu wedding, kanyādāna (कन्यादान) refers to the ritual where a father gives his daughter's hand in marriage to the groom, after asking the groom to promise that he will never fail in his pursuit of dharma (moral and lawful life), artha (wealth) and kama (love). The groom promises to the bride's father, and repeats his promise three times in presence of all gathered as witness.

Other types of charity includes donating means of economic activity and food source. For example, godāna (donation of a cow), bhudāna (भूदान) (donation of land), and vidyādāna or jñānadāna (विद्यादान, ज्ञानदान): Sharing knowledge and teaching skills, aushadhādāna (औषधदान): Charity of care for the sick and diseased, abhayadāna(अभयदान): giving freedom from fear (asylum, protection to someone facing imminent injury), and anna dāna (अन्नादान): Giving food to the poor, needy and all visitors.

The effect of dāna
Charity is held as a noble deed in Hinduism, to be done without expectation of any return from those who receive the charity. Some texts reason, referring to the nature of social life, that charity is a form of good karma that affects one's future circumstances and environment, and that good charitable deeds leads to good future life because of the reciprocity principle.

Other Hindu texts, such as Vyasa Samhita, state that reciprocity may be innate in human nature and social functions but dāna is a virtue in itself, as doing good lifts the nature of one who gives. The texts do not recommend charity to unworthy recipients or where charity may harm or encourage injury to or by the recipient. Dāna, thus, is a dharmic act, requires idealistic-normative approach, and has spiritual and philosophical context. The donor's intent and responsibility for diligence about the effect of dāna on the recipient is considered as important as the dāna itself. While the donor should not expect anything in return with dāna, the donor is expected to make an effort to determine the character of the recipient, likely return to the recipient and to the society. Some medieval era authors state that dāna is best done with shraddha (faith), which is defined as being in good will, cheerful, welcoming the recipient of the charity and giving without anasuya (finding faults in the recipient). These scholars of Hinduism, states Kohler, suggest that charity is most effective when it is done with delight, a sense of "unquestioning hospitality", where the dāna ignores the short term weaknesses as well as the circumstances of the recipient and takes a long term view.

In historical record
Xuanzang, the Chinese pilgrim to India, describes many "Punya-śālās" (houses of goodness, merit, charity) in his 7th-century CE memoir. He mentions these Punyasalas and Dharmasalas in Takka (Punjab) and other north Indian places such as near the Deva temples of Haridwar at the mouth of river Ganges and eight Deva temples in Mulasthanapura. These, recorded Xuanzang, served the poor and the unfortunate, providing them food, clothing and medicine, also welcoming travelers and the destitute. So common were these, he wrote, that "travelers [like him] were never badly off."

Al-Biruni, the Persian historian, who visited and lived in India for 16 years from about 1017, mentions the practice of charity and almsgiving among Hindus as he observed during his stay. He wrote, "It is obligatory with them (Hindus) every day to give alms as much as possible."

Satrams, called Choultry, Dharamsala or Chathrams in parts of India, have been one expression of Hindu charity. Satrams are shelters (rest houses) for travelers and the poor, with many serving water and free food. These were usually established along the roads connecting major Hindu temple sites in South Asia as well as near major temples.

Hindu temples served as charitable institutions. Burton Stein states that South Indian temples collected donations (melvarum) from devotees, during the Chola dynasty and Vijayanagara Empire periods in 1st millennium through first half of 2nd millennium AD. These dāna were then used to feed people in distress as well as fund public projects such as irrigation and land reclamation.

Hindu treatises on dāna
Mitākṣarā by Vijñāneśvara is an 11th-century canonical discussion and commentary on dāna, composed under the patronage of Chalukya dynasty. The discussion about charity is included in its thesis on ācāra (moral conduct).

Major Sanskrit treatises that discuss ethics, methods and rationale for charity and alms giving in Hinduism include, states Maria Heim, the 12th-century Dāna Kānda "Book of Giving" by Laksmidhara of Kannauj, the 12th-century Dāna Sāgara "Sea of Giving" by Ballālasena of Bengal, and the 14th-century sub-book Dānakhanda in Caturvargacintamani "The Gem of the Four Aims of Human Life" by Hemadiri of Devagiri (modern Daulatabad, Maharashtra). The first two are few hundred page treatises each, while the third is over a thousand-page compendium on charity, from a region that is now part of modern-day eastern Maharashtra and Telangana; the text influenced Hindus of Deccan region and South India from 14th to 19th centuries.

Buddhism

Dāna as a formal religious act is directed specifically to a monastic or spiritually-developed person. In Buddhist thought, it has the effect of purifying and transforming the mind of the giver.

Generosity developed through giving leads to experience of material wealth and possibly being reborn in happy states. In the Pāli Canon's Dighajanu Sutta, generosity (denoted there by the Pāli word cāga, which can be synonymous with dāna) is identified as one of the four traits conditioning happiness and wealth in the next life. Conversely, lack of giving leads to unhappy states and poverty.

Dāna leads to one of the pāramitās or "perfections", the dānapāramitā. This can be characterized by unattached and unconditional generosity, giving and letting go.

Buddhists believe that giving without seeking anything in return leads to greater spiritual wealth. Moreover, it reduces the acquisitive impulses that ultimately lead to continued suffering from egotism.

Dāna, or generosity, can be given in both material or immaterial ways. Spiritual giving-- or the gift of noble teachings, known as dhamma-dāna, is said by the Buddha to surpass all other gifts. This type of generosity includes those who elucidate the Buddha’s teachings such as monks who preach sermons or recite from the Tripiṭaka, teachers of meditation, unqualified persons who encourage others to keep precepts or helping support teachers of meditation. The most common form of giving is in material gifts such as food, money, robes, and medicine.

Jainism
Dana is, as with Hindu texts like Mitaksara and Vahni Purana and in Buddhist texts, described as a virtue and duty in Jainism. It is considered an act of compassion, and must be done with no desire for material gain. Four types of Dana are discussed in the texts of Jainism: Ahara-dana (donation of food), Ausadha-dana (donation of medicine), Jnana-dana (donation of knowledge) and Abhaya-dana (giving of protection or freedom from fear, asylum to someone under threat). Dāna is one of ten means to gain positive karma, in the soteriological theories of Jainism. Medieval era texts of Jainism dedicate a substantial portion of their discussions to the need and virtue of Dāna. Yashastilaka'''s book VIII section 43 is dedicated to the concept of dana in Jainism.

Sikhism

Dāna, called Vand Chhako, is considered one of three duties of Sikhs. The duty entails sharing part of one's earnings with others, by giving to charity and caring for others. Examples of dāna in Sikhism include selfless service and langar.

See also
 Alms
 Buddhist ethics
 Buddhist economics
 Charity (practice)
 Dīghajāṇu Sutta''
 Economic anthropology
 Gift economy
 Merit (Buddhism)
 Niyama
 Offering (Buddhism)
 Pāramī
 Philanthropy
 Tulabhara (tuladana)
 Vessantara Jātaka
 Virtue
 Tithe
 Yavanarajya inscription – a 1st century BCE donation inscription from Mathura
 Zidqa, almsgiving in Mandaeism

References

Citations

Sources

Further reading
 Maria Heim (2004), Theories of the Gift in Medieval South Asia: Hindu, Buddhist, and Jain, Routledge, 
 Vijay Nath (1987), Dāna, gift system in ancient India, c. 600 BC - c. AD 300: a socio-economic perspective, Munshiram Manoharlal Publishers,

External links
 Philanthropy in India, K.A.N. Singh, Queensland University of Technology, Australia (2002)
 Dana -- The Practice of Giving.   Selected essays edited by Bhikkhu Bodhi(BPS Wheel Publication No. 367 / 369)
 Revealing Indian Philanthropy M Cantegreil et al., UBS, Switzerland (2013)

Alms in Buddhism
Hindu philosophical concepts
Hindu ethics
Buddhist ethics
Jain ethics
Relational ethics
Sanskrit words and phrases
Alms in Hinduism
Wholesome factors in Buddhism
Pali words and phrases